The Same Trailer Different Tour (also known as the Same Tour Different Trailer) was the first concert tour by American recording artist Kacey Musgraves. The tour supported her debut studio album, Same Trailer Different Park (2013). The tour played 80 concerts in North America and Europe. The tour was produced by AEG Live and The Messina Group.

Opening acts
Rayland Baxter 
John & Jacob 
Sugar + the Hi-Lows 
Count This Penny 
Humming House

Setlist
The following setlist was obtained from the September 19, 2013 concert, held at the Bowery Ballroom in New York City, New York. It does not represent all concerts for the duration of the tour.
 
"The Trailer Song"
"Stupid"
"Silver Lining"
"Island in the Sun"
"I Miss You"
"Blowin' Smoke"
"Keep It to Yourself"
"I Put a Spell on You"
"Mama's Broken Heart"
"High Time"
"Back on the Map"
"It Is What It Is"
"Step Off" / "Three Little Birds"
"Merry Go 'Round"
Encore
"Rainbow"
"My House"
"Follow Your Arrow"

Tour dates

Festivals and other miscellaneous performances
This concert was a part of the "Ocean City Sunfest"
This concert was a part of "Farm Aid"
This concert was a part of the "Southern Ground Music & Food Festival"
This concert was a part of the "8 Man Jam"
This concert was a part of the "Harvest Music Festival"
This concert was a part of the "State Fair of Texas"
This concert was a part of "We Can Survive"
This concert was a part of the "Christmas Jam"
This concert was a part of the "Glastonbury Festival"
This concert was a part of "Orvieto4ever"
This concert was a part of the "Cornbury Music Festival"
This concert was a part of "Lulu’s Barkin’ BBQ"
This concert was a part of "Outside Lands Music and Arts Festival"
This concert was a part of the "Radio 2 Live in Hyde Park"
This concert was a part of "Life Is Beautiful"
This concert was a part of the "Country for Kids Concert"
This concert was a part of "Opry at The Ryman"
This concert was a part of the "Stagecoach Festival"
This concert was a part of the "New Orleans Jazz & Heritage Festival"

Box office score data

External links
Kacey Musgraves Official Website

References

2013 concert tours
2014 concert tours
2015 concert tours
Kacey Musgraves